Nawal Kishore Dhawal (11 November 1911, in Sasorh village, Sarmera, Nalanda District, Bengal Presidency – 17 April 1964) was an Indian writer, poet, proof reader, editor, critic, journalist and author of many different literary works of his time.

Works
 Baandh Aur Dhara (drama)
 Vibhishan Ka Beta (drama)
 Mann ka Pher (drama)
 Ek Baat Ghar Haat Ka (Poetry)

1911 births
1964 deaths
People from Bihar